Milwaukee Career College (MCC) is a private, for-profit technical school in Wauwatosa, Wisconsin.

History 
Milwaukee Career College opened on December 1, 2002. Today, the school has Dental Assistant, Medical Assistant, Veterinarian Assistant and Veterinarian Technician programs. The MCC campus is disability-accessible and has laboratories, medical equipment and office machines for training; a simulated pharmacy; and a student study area and lounge.

Accreditation 
MCC is accredited by the Accrediting Bureau of Health Education Schools (ABHES)  and approved to do business in Wisconsin as a private school by the Wisconsin Educational Approval Board, subject to the provisions of the Wisconsin Statutes and all Wisconsin Administrative Codes adopted pursuant to the statutes of the State of Wisconsin.

References

External links 
Official website

Universities and colleges in Milwaukee